The Mararit language is a Taman language spoken in eastern Chad. There are two dialects, Ibiri and Abou Charib, which Blench (2006) counts as distinct languages. The majority speak the Abou Charid.

Mararit people live in Argid Mararit, Abid Mararit, Wadah area, Donkey Kuma, Sani Kiro, in North Darfur State; in Silala area in South Darfur State and in Gienena province in West Darfur State.  The Talgai, Mirakawi, Wilkawi, and Tirgawi are tribes of the Mararit people.

Dialects
There are three dialects according to Rilly (2010:175):
 Mararit proper (autonyms: Ibiri, Abiri, Abiyi, Ebiri), spoken in Am Dam District, Chad. A minority is scattered in Sudan. Neighboring languages are Tama, spoken to the north, and Sungor, spoken to the south.
 Abu Sharib, spoken near Biltine, to the west of Mararit proper. It is intelligible with Mararit proper.
 Darnut, reported by Edgar (1991)

References

External links
 Mararit (Ibiri) basic lexicon at the Global Lexicostatistical Database

Taman languages
Languages of Chad